Cardiac impression can refer to:
 Cardiac impression on liver
 Cardiac impression on lung